Bernice Lorene Shaw (also known as B. L. "Buddy" Shaw; September 6, 1933 – January 18, 2018), was a Louisiana educator and politician who served in the Louisiana State Senate.

Shaw died early in 2018 at the age of eighty-four, and was interred at Providence Cemetery in Ringgold, Louisiana.

Caddo Parish School Superintendent T. Lamar Goree described Shaw as "undoubtedly a legend in our district and a man who set C. E. Byrd apart from the crowd. He was a career educator who loved the students of this district and spent his life in service to the community. ... his legacy will long be remembered."

}

References 

1933 births
2018 deaths
Republican Party members of the Louisiana House of Representatives
Republican Party Louisiana state senators
Politicians from Shreveport, Louisiana
Baptists from Louisiana
Northwestern State University alumni
Louisiana State University alumni
Schoolteachers from Louisiana
American school principals
School board members in Louisiana
United States Army soldiers
Burials in Louisiana
20th-century Baptists